Nauru is one of 35 countries where Scouting exists (be it embryonic or widespread) but where there is no national Scout organisation which is yet a member of the World Organization of the Scout Movement. Scouting in Nauru is closely tied to Scouts Australia, and especially to Scouts in Geelong, Victoria, a port with which Nauru does much trading. Relationships between the Geelong Scouts and the Nauruan Scouts date back to the 1930s, and continue into modern times.

Although Nauru does have a Guiding organisation, work towards World Association of Girl Guides and Girl Scouts membership recognition remains unclear.

History
The Nauru Scouting organisation was approved by the Melbourne Scout Headquarters. As of December 1937, more one eighth of the island's population were Scouts. Scouting began in Nauru due to concerns over a decline in physical activity due to the ease of life brought about by the discovery of phosphate.

In 1982, Nauru printed a miniature sheet of stamps commemorating the Year of the Scout.

Relationship with Geelong Scouts
One of the first records of interaction between the Nauruan Scouts and the Geelong Scouts is of the 1934 Jamboree, where members from both groups camped next to each other.

Harold Hurst, former leader of the Geelong Scouts of Frankston, was a driving force in establishing ties between the two groups, having provided transportation, accommodation and education for visiting Nauruan Scouts.

In the 1930s, the Geelong Scouts collected books to send to Nauru. As of 1936, the Nauru Scout organisation had a library of approximately 1000 volumes.

As recently as May 2013, Scouts from Nauru have visited Scouts from Geelong.

See also

References

External links
Some information about sections, Promise, etc

Nauru
Nauru
Organisations based in Nauru